Hypericum concinnum is a species of flowering plant known as gold-wire or goldwire. It is in the St. John's wort family, Hypericaceae. It is the only species in the section Hypericum sect. Concinna.

Hypericum concinnum is a small, perennial plant with bright yellow flowers. The flower has long petals which fold back from the bloom, with a spray of thin stamens and pistils. It is endemic to California.

References

External links
Jepson Manual Treatment
USDA Plants Profile
Photos

concinnum
Endemic flora of California